Yoon Dong-Hun  (Hangul: 윤동헌; Hanja: 尹東憲; born 2 May 1983) is a former South Korean professional footballer. He is currently a coach at Hong Kong Premier League club Kitchee.

Career
He was selected by Ulsan Hyundai in the 2007 K-League draft. He made his professional debut in the League Cup match on 18 April but no appearance in the 2007 season. He moved to Ansan Hallelujah after the unsuccessful debut season ended.

References

External links 

Yoon Dong-hun at HKFA
 

1983 births
Living people
South Korean footballers
South Korean expatriate footballers
Association football midfielders
Ulsan Hyundai FC players
Goyang Zaicro FC players
K League 1 players
Korea National League players
K League 2 players
Expatriate footballers in Hong Kong
Hong Kong Premier League players
Dreams Sports Club players
Hong Kong League XI representative players